Sami Ali El Choum (born 22 June 1982) is a Lebanese football coach and former player who is head coach of  club Sporting.

A defensive midfielder for Lebanese Premier League side Ansar, El Choum remained at the Beirut-based club for over 10 years, winning multiple titles. He played for Homenetmen in the Lebanese Second Division for one year. El Choum represented the Lebanon national team in 2003.

Between 2017 and 2018 El Choum coached Ansar, winning the 2016–17 Lebanese FA Cup, before becoming coach of Third Division side Sporting in 2018, leading them to back-to-back promotions to the Premier League.

Club career 
El Choum signed for Ansar's youth side on 31 October 1997. He debuted in the Lebanese Premier League during the 2002–03 season. During his time at Ansar, El Choum won two league titles (2005–06, 2006–07), for Lebanese FA Cups (2005–06, 2006–07, 2009–10, 2011–12), and one Lebanese Super Cup (2012). In 2015 El Choum played for Lebanese Second Division side Homenetmen.

International career
On 23 August 2003 El Choum made his senior international debut for Lebanon, in a friendly against Syria; Lebanon won 1–0. He played a total of four games for his country, all in 2003.

Managerial career

Ansar 
Initially a coach for Ansar's youth sides since 2013, El Choum became the assistant coach of Zoran Pešić, Ansar's first team coach. El Choum became Ansar's coach on 5 February 2017, helping them lift the 2016–17 Lebanese FA Cup. In 2017 El Choum became Ansar's assistant coach, before being re-called as temporary head coach on 27 November 2017, during the 2017–18 season. On 16 January 2018 El Choum resigned from his coaching position.

Sporting 
El Choum was appointed head coach of Sporting in the Lebanese Third Division, ahead of the 2018–19 season. He helped them win the league, and returned to the Lebanese Second Division after five years. The following season, in 2020–21, he led the team to win the Second Division, and qualify to the Lebanese Premier League for the first time in their history.

Personal life 
El Chom has two younger brothers, Ahmad and Kassem, who have also played football.

Honours

Player
Ansar
 Lebanese Premier League: 2005–06, 2006–07
 Lebanese FA Cup: 2005–06, 2006–07, 2009–10, 2011–12
 Lebanese Super Cup: 2012

Manager
Ansar
 Lebanese FA Cup: 2016–17

Sporting
 Lebanese Second Division: 2020–21
 Lebanese Third Division: 2018–19

See also
 List of Lebanon international footballers born outside Lebanon
 List of association football families

References

External links
 
 
 
 
 

1982 births
Living people
Sportspeople from Jeddah
Lebanese footballers
Association football midfielders
Association football central defenders
Al Ansar FC players
Homenetmen Beirut footballers
Lebanese Premier League players
Lebanese Second Division players
Lebanon international footballers
Asian Games competitors for Lebanon
Footballers at the 2002 Asian Games
Association football coaches
Lebanese football managers
Lebanese Premier League managers
Lebanese Second Division managers
Al Ansar FC managers
AC Sporting managers